Hernán Llerena (28 December 1928 – 14 March 2010) was a Peruvian cyclist. He competed in the individual and team road race events at the 1948 Summer Olympics.

References

External links
 

1928 births
2010 deaths
Peruvian male cyclists
Olympic cyclists of Peru
Cyclists at the 1948 Summer Olympics
People from Arequipa
Pan American Games medalists in cycling
Pan American Games bronze medalists for Peru
Cyclists at the 1951 Pan American Games
Medalists at the 1951 Pan American Games
20th-century Peruvian people
21st-century Peruvian people